Blame It on the Bellboy is a 1992 comedy film written and directed by Mark Herman and starring Dudley Moore, Bryan Brown, Patsy Kensit, Richard Griffiths, Andreas Katsulas, and Bronson Pinchot. The plot is about a case of mistaken identity of three individuals with similar-sounding surnames staying at the same hotel.

Plot 

Three men board the same plane at Heathrow Airport, bound for Venice: Melvyn Orton, a shy and unassuming clerk with an assignment of purchasing a house in Venice under penalty of losing his job; Mike Lorton, a hitman en route to Venice to kill his next mark, and Lord Maurice Horton, a rather large man who is mayor of a small city in the United Kingdom.

All register in the Hotel Gabrielli. The first to check in is Maurice. He establishes that his name is Horton with an overeager bellboy who struggles with properly pronouncing the letter "H". Melvyn arrives next. He is checked in by the hotel's manager, who initially believes that he and Mr. Horton are the same person until Melvyn clarifies the spelling of his name. Third to arrive is Mike Lorton. They are all expecting messages: Melvyn from a real estate agency that is selling a worthless villa in the Lido, Mike from the Mafia, and Maurice from a dating agency called Medi-Date. When the bellboy receives the message for Melvyn, he mistakenly delivers it to Maurice. The message from Medi-Date goes instead to Mike, who now believes that his "mark" is the woman Maurice was supposed to meet with. Melvyn, meanwhile, receives Mike's instructions to 'visit' a local mob boss.

Maurice is shown around the villa by Caroline Wright, who has received instructions to sell the house immediately. If she gets the money in cash, her commission will be tripled, allowing her to purchase a speed boat, something she very much desires. Maurice is under the false impression that they are on a date, planning to have sex with her, but is baffled by the fact that she seems very intent (supported by double entendre) to get to "the nitty gritty".

Mike is following Patricia (who was supposed to be Maurice's date) around Venice, trying to find the courage to kill her, for he is having second thoughts about his chosen profession. Melvyn calls seeking Mr. Scarpa, a mafioso who knows he is being sought by a killer, and is detained by thugs, taken to a cellar and tortured.

Maurice takes Caroline out for lunch, and Patricia has noticed Mike following her around and engages him in conversation. Mike is unsure of what to make of this, for he believes he is there to kill Patricia, and she believes he is trying to go on a date with her. Melvyn is permitted to call his boss in England, trying to prove his story that he is there to buy Mr. Scarpa's extravagant house rather than kill him. While Scarpa and his men listen, Marshall thunders abuse at Melvyn and hangs up. Scarpa remarks that Melvyn is living life like a worm, letting his boss insult him so freely, but is still convinced Melvyn and this "Mr. Marshall" want him dead. The interrogation resumes, with Scarpa's men preparing to use electricity on Melvyn's genitals, but he remembers a man at his hotel – Maurice – with a similar last name. Scarpa and his men, now suspecting Maurice as the assassin, head to the hotel and take Melvyn with them.

Maurice has tried to make a move on Caroline, who is offended, each still mistaking the other's agenda. His belief that she is a prostitute is compounded by her confusion that he would pay cash for the villa if she agrees to have sex with him.

Mike is about to kill Patricia, but stops at the last minute. Everyone returns to the hotel: Maurice and Caroline to have sex, Mike to figure out what to do with Patricia, and Melvyn to check out and run for his life.

Melvyn is trapped again by the mafiosi and led upstairs to a new room. Mike and Patricia have clarified that she is not his mark and that Medi-Date is a legitimate company, not a cover. Maurice, after having sex with Caroline, informs her he isn't going to buy the villa, for he lives in England and has little use for a home in Venice. Melvyn is being tortured again when the bellboy comes in, escorting Mrs. Horton, who is irritated to discover she's been led to the wrong room.

Caroline is in Maurice's bathroom, considering the possibility that Maurice may very well cheat her out of the money he had promised, when the bellboy brings Mrs. Horton in. She has become suspicious that Maurice is cheating on her, and after speaking with his secretary became certain Maurice was going to Venice to meet another woman. Caroline uses this as a chance to blackmail Maurice, implying that if he pays one hundred thousand pounds, in cash, she will keep their tryst secret.

Maurice calls his bank manager in the UK to have the money transferred to him in Venice, a conversation overheard by Mike and the mafiosi. Mike and Patricia assume that Maurice has killed the mark and received the money, for one hundred thousand pounds was Mike's fee. The mafiosi have decided to kill Mr. Horton and Mr. Orton, convinced the former is a cleverly disguised assassin and that the latter knows too much. They obtain a remotely detonated bomb, intending to make use of it later.

Maurice receives the money, places it in a briefcase, and leaves it in the hotel safe. The mafiosi get a matching briefcase in which they hide the bomb, and upon placing it in the hotel safe swap tags on the two identical briefcases. Maurice takes his briefcase and leaves for the villa with Mike and the mafiosi in pursuit. Mike and Patricia try to steal the suitcase, and a struggle ensues between them, the Hortons, and Caroline over the money. Melvyn, sitting in a raft offshore, is ordered to set off the bomb by an impatient Mr. Scarpa, whose boat is sitting further offshore, unable to get any closer. As Melvyn tries to comply, one of Scarpa's henchmen realizes a horrifying mistake- he and another of Scarpa's men both swapped the tags on the briefcases. Realizing the bomb is on the boat, Scarpa screams at his men to throw the briefcase overboard and begins firing at Melvyn with a pistol. Scarpa is trying to stop him from setting off the bomb, but Melvyn assumes the Mafiosi have become impatient and are telling him to hurry up. The detonator finally works, and Scarpa's boat explodes and sinks.

Mike retreats to the Hotel Gabrielli in a panic. The organization he works for doesn't forgive mistakes, and given what has happened he now fears for his life. When the bellboy knocks on the door, Mike grabs him and holds him at gunpoint while Patricia reads the message from Mike's employer: given that his mark (actually Mr. Scarpa) and two of his top men were killed, he has been paid a generous bonus in addition to his original fee.

Melvyn calls Mr. Marshall and tricks him out of £355,000.00, the price for Mr. Scarpa's house in Venice. Mr. Marshall arrives at Scarpa's house sometime later, and Mr. Scarpa's men avenge their boss.

The epilogue states that Melvyn takes the money and runs for the Bahamas, where he sets up a sporting goods business specialising in testicle protectors. Caroline finally gets the speedboat she has long dreamed of owning, but it crashes due to faulty engineering and she cheerfully sues the boat's maker for all the money she can get. She later marries a sumo wrestler. The Hortons' villa falls apart and so does their marriage. The former Mrs. Horton soon finds a new and better husband, while Maurice is still looking for love. Mike and Patricia, having become very fond of each other in their time in Venice, decide to marry. Mike finally ends his career as an assassin, opening up a flower shop as he had long desired to do. Patricia goes on to represent Great Britain & Northern Ireland in the Olympics, having become exceptionally skilled with short-barrel firearms. And the bellboy eventually gets the sack.

Cast

Reception
The film was critically panned. It holds a 19% rating on Rotten Tomatoes based on 16 reviews.

Box office
It opened in the United Kingdom on January 24, 1992, through Warner Bros., the then European theatrical partner of Buena Vista Pictures, and grossed £956,220 for the week from 262 screens, placing second at the box office, behind JFK which opened in the same week. Elsewhere, the film was a box office flop.

References

External links

1992 films
1992 comedy films
British comedy films
1990s English-language films
Films about contract killing
Films set in hotels
Films set in Venice
Hollywood Pictures films
Mafia comedy films
Films scored by Trevor Jones
Films directed by Mark Herman
1990s American films
1990s British films
1992 directorial debut films